George Gage (1813-1899) was a politician from McHenry County, Illinois he a member of the state legislature from 1850 until 1852 and was the first state senator from the county and served from 1854 until 1858. He was instrumental in bringing the rail road to the city of McHenry.

References 

People from McHenry, Illinois
Members of the Illinois House of Representatives
Illinois state senators
1813 births
1899 deaths
19th-century American politicians